Pateros will hold its local elections on Monday, May 13, 2019, as a part of the 2019 Philippine general election. Voters will elect candidates for the local elective posts in the municipality: the mayor, vice mayor, District representative of Pateros-Taguig, and councilors, six in each of the city's two legislative districts.

Mayoral and Vice Mayoral elections

Mayor

Vice Mayor

District representative
Incumbent Congressman Arnel Cerafica is term-limited and is running for Mayor of Taguig. His brother, Allan Cerafica, competed for the position against former Foreign Affairs Secretary Alan Peter Cayetano.

City Council

By ticket

Team Willie

Team AIG

By district

1st District

|-bgcolor=black
|colspan=7|

2nd District

|-bgcolor=black
|colspan=7|

References

2019 Philippine local elections
Elections in Pateros
May 2019 events in the Philippines
2019 elections in Metro Manila